Live in Zurich is an album by American jazz pianist Marilyn Crispell, which was recorded in 1989 and released on the English Leo label. It was the second of three concerts which her trio with bassist Reggie Workman and drummer Paul Motian gave in Switzerland.

Reception

In a review for AllMusic, Ron Wynn wrote: "Crispell keeps cranking out furious, aggressive free dates for the European market. They're devoid of any devices now in vogue on the jazz circuit: no standards, no electronics, no hard bop, Adult Contemporary, strings, or fusion. If you enjoy hearing spirited dialogues between Crispell, bassist Reggie Workman, and drummer Paul Motian, this one's for you."

The authors of the Penguin Guide to Jazz Recordings stated: "There are moments of clutter on this set ... but also signs that Crispell had found a group that allowed her to extend her rhythmic ideas still further. Signing off with Coltrane's 'Dear Lord' was a familiar enough tactic by this stage, but listen to how she relocates the song's harmonies by subtly distorting its metre. A fine and affecting performance and a very enjoyable record."

Track listing
All compositions by Marilyn Crispell except where noted.

 "Areas / Solstice" – 21:59
 "Night Light Beach II" – 10:06
 "Duets / Point on Time" – 13:39
 "Dear Lord" (John Coltrane) – 6:20

Personnel
Marilyn Crispell – piano, voice
Reggie Workman - bass
Paul Motian - drums

References

1990 live albums
Marilyn Crispell live albums
Leo Records live albums